Câmpulung County is one of the historic counties of the Kingdom of Romania, in the historical region of Bukovina. The county seat was Câmpulung Moldovenesc.

Geography
Câmpulung County covered 2,349 km2 and was located in the northern part of Greater Romania, in the southern part of Bukovina. Currently, the territory that comprised Câmpulung County is now included at present in Suceava County. In the interwar period, the county was bordered by Rădăuți County to the north, Suceava County to the east, Baia County to the southeast, Neamț and Mureș Counties to the south, and Năsăud County to the west.

History

After World War I, the territory of the county along with most of Transylvania was transferred from Austria-Hungary to Romania. This transfer was confirmed in the 1920 Treaty of Trianon. Based on the 1923 Romanian Constitution and the Law of Administrative Unification of 1925, Câmpulung County was established, with its capital at Câmpulung Moldovenesc.  In 1938, the county was disestablished and incorporated into the newly formed Ținutul Suceava, but it was re-established in 1940 after the fall of Carol II's regime. In World War II, the county was part of the Bukovina Governorate and was later invaded and occupied by Soviet forces.

Following the administrative and territorial reform of 1950, made after the Soviet model, all counties were abolished and regions and districts established. The territory of the county then became part of Suceava Region. On 17 February 1968 the administrative and territorial divisions were returned to counties, but Câmpulung County was not re-established.

Administrative organization

Administratively, Câmpulung County was originally divided into three districts (plăși): 
Plasa Dorna, headquartered at Vatra Dornei
Plasa Humor, headquartered at Gura Humorului
Plasa Moldova, headquartered at Câmpulung Moldovenesc

Later, a fourth district was carved out from Plasa Moldova:
Plasa Moldovița, headquartered at Vama

There were four urban localities in the county: Câmpulung Moldovenesc, Vatra Dornei, Gura Humorului, and Vama.

Population 
According to the 1930 census data, the county population was 94,816, ethnically divided among Romanians (61.3%), Germans (20.2%), Jews (8.2%), Ukrainians (6.7%), Poles (1.8%), as well as other minorities.  From the religious point of view, the population consisted of Eastern Orthodox (68.2%), Roman Catholic (16.9%), Jewish (8.2%), Lutheran (5.5%), as well as other minorities.

Urban population 
The four urban localities of the county as of the 1930 census were: Câmpulung Moldovenesc (population 10,071), Vatra Dornei (9,826), Gura Humorului (6,042), and Vama (5,315).

In 1930, the county's urban population was 31,254, ethnically divided among Romanians (56.3%), Germans (22.6%), Jews (17.9%), Poles (1.5%), as well as other minorities. From the religious point of view, the urban population consisted of 55.6% Eastern Orthodox, 19.4% Roman Catholic, 17.9% Jewish, 5.2% Lutheran, 1.6% Greek Catholic, as well as other minorities.

References

External links

  Câmpulung County on memoria.ro

Former counties of Romania
Bukovina
1925 establishments in Romania
1938 disestablishments in Romania
States and territories disestablished in 1938
States and territories established in 1925
1940 establishments in Romania
1950 disestablishments in Romania
States and territories established in 1940
States and territories disestablished in 1950